The Uftyuga is a river in Krasnoborsky District of Arkhangelsk Oblast in Russia. It is a right tributary of the Northern Dvina. The Uftyuga freezes in mid-October to early November and stays under the ice until mid-April to early May. Its main tributary is the Lakhoma (right).

The source of the Uftyuga is on the border between Krasnoborsky and Lensky Districts. The river flows south-west. The biggest settlements on the river are Kulikovo, Verkhnyaya Uftyuga, and Beryozonavolok. At its mouth, the Uftyuga flows into the Peschany Poloy, a branch of the Northern Dvina to the east of its main course. The Peschany Poloy then joins the Northern Dvina nearly opposite Krasnoborsk (which is on the left bank).

The State Water Register of Russia lists  of the river's lower course, from Kulikovo downstream, as navigable.

References

External links

Rivers of Arkhangelsk Oblast